Gregory Benton Jefferson (born August 31, 1971) is an American educator and former American football defensive end in the National Football League. He was drafted by the Philadelphia Eagles in the third round of the 1995 NFL Draft. He played college football at UCF.

NFL stats

Personal life
Jefferson is currently a teacher for Orange County Public Schools. He has two daughters, both are professional weightlifters who graduated from Ocoee High School.

References

1971 births
Living people
American football defensive ends
UCF Knights football players
Philadelphia Eagles players
Orlando Predators players